At World's End is a 2009 Danish action comedy film directed by Tomas Villum Jensen and starring Nikolaj Lie Kaas, Birgitte Hjort Sørensen and Nikolaj Coster-Waldau.

Plot 
During the filming of a nature programme in the Indonesian rain forest, a British TV crew discover a rare white flower, but are attacked and killed by a Danish hermit, Severin Geertsen (Nikolaj Coster-Waldau). Severin, who is sentenced to death for the crime, claims he is 129 years old and that it is the leaves of the flower that have kept him young. Criminal psychiatrist Adrian (Nikolaj Lie Kaas) and his assistant, Beate (Birgitte Hjort Sørensen) are sent to Indonesia by the Danish authorities to mentally examine Severin. Although the claim that the flower gives eternal life sounds like a hoax, within hours Adrian, Severin and Beate are fleeing from international fortune hunters and the Indonesian army, who all want to acquire the flower.

Cast 
 Nikolaj Lie Kaas as Adrian Gabrielsen
 Birgitte Hjort Sørensen as Beate
 Nikolaj Coster-Waldau as Severin Geertsen 
 Nicolas Bro as Mikael Feldt
 Søren Pilmark as Consul
 Ulf Pilgaard as Werner Gabrielsen
 Birthe Neumann as Bitten Gabrielsen
 Steven Berkoff as Jack Pudovski

External links 

At World's End on Cineuropa
At World's End on NordicDrama

Danish action comedy films
Films set in Indonesia
2009 action comedy films
2009 films
2009 comedy films
Films with screenplays by Anders Thomas Jensen
2000s Danish-language films